Bertrand d'Astorg (7 November 1913 – 21 October 1988) was a 20th-century French poet and writer.

Works 
1945: Introduction au monde de la Terreur Éditions du Seuil, 
1952: Aspects de la littérature européenne depuis 1945, 
1953: D’amour et d'amitié : poèmes 1934-1952
1963: Le Mythe de la dame à la licorne.
1966: Un retour imprévu du Cosmos, ou l’Ange et le sauvage (radio play)
1971: Le mystère de Salomé on Revue des deux mondes
1980: Les noces orientales : essai sur quelques formes féminines dans l’imaginaire occidental, Prix de l'essai
1982: Exercices
1990: Variations sur l’interdit majeur : littérature et inceste en Occident Éditions Gallimard; series: Connaissance de l'Inconscient,

Studies on the author 
1990: Richard Blin, Le Modelé de l'imaginaire (Pour saluer Bertrand d'Astorg), La Nouvelle Revue française, issue 453, Octobre
2000: , Les Pierres Vives de Bertrand d’Astorg, Thélème: Revista complutense de estudios franceses, issue 23, autumn 2008, Madrid, .

References

External links 
  Bertrand d'Astorg on Babelio
 Bertrand d'Astorg on the site of Éditions Gallimard
 Bertrand d'Astorg on the site of  the Académie française

20th-century French male writers
20th-century French poets
1913 births
1988 deaths
People from Pau, Pyrénées-Atlantiques